Chen Yannian (1898 – 4 July 1927) was a Chinese revolutionary and early leader of the Communist Party.

Biography
Chen was born in Anqing Prefecture, Anhui, in 1898, to Chen Duxiu, a revolutionary socialist, educator, philosopher and author, who co-founded the Communist Party with Li Dazhao in 1921. His siblings were, in order of birth: Chen Qiaonian, Chen Songnian and Chen Yuying. He attended the Anqing Shangzhi School and Quanwan Middle School. In 1915, he went to study in Shanghai with his younger brother Chen Qiaonian. Soon after, the two brothers were accepted to Aurora University.

In December 1919, under the influence of the May Fourth Movement, the two brothers went to France to study under a work-study programme. In June 1922, he co-founded the Chinese Youth Communist Party with Zhao Shiyan and Zhou Enlai and served as the propaganda director. In 1922, he joined the French Communist Party. In the winter of 1922, with the approval of the CPC Central Committee, the two brother joined the Communist Party.

In September 1924, Chen returned to Shanghai. In October, he came to Guangzhou as a special commissioner of the Central Committee of the Communist Party of China and served as secretary of Guangdong Provincial Committee of the Communist Youth League of China and director of the Organization Department. In February 1925, he succeeded Zhou Enlai as secretary of the CPC Guangdong Provincial Committee. In June, Chen, Deng Zhongxia, Su Zhaozheng led the Canton–Hong Kong strike.

In April 1927, when Chen went to Wuhan to attend the 5th National Congress of the Communist Party of China, the Central Committee appointed him to take over the post of secretary of the CPC Jiangsu and Zhejiang Provincial Committee and was elected an alternate member of the Political Bureau of the 5th Central Committee of the Communist Party of China. On his way to Shanghai, the Shanghai massacre broke out. In June 1927, the Central Committee abolished the Jiangsu and Zhejiang Provincial Committee and established Jiangsu Provincial Committee and Zhejiang Provincial Committee respectively. Chen was appointed secretary of the CPC Jiangsu Provincial Committee. On June 26, he was arrested by the Kuomintang police, and later tortured during questioning. On the evening of 4 July 1927, he was pinned down and hacked to death by the Kuomintang police after refusing to kneel for his execution.

In 2009, he was selected as "100 Heroes and Models who made Outstanding Contributions to the Founding of New China" by the Propaganda Department and the Organization Department.

Monuments
There is a road named "Yanqiao Road" after him and his younger brother Chen Qiaonian in Hefei, Anhui.

References

Works cited
 

1898 births
1927 deaths
Chinese Communist Party politicians from Anhui
Delegates to the 5th National Congress of the Chinese Communist Party
Members of the 5th Central Committee of the Chinese Communist Party
People from Anqing
Republic of China politicians from Anhui